Norway was represented by Kirsti Sparboe, with the song "Oj, oj, oj, så glad jeg skal bli", at the 1969 Eurovision Song Contest, which took place on 29 March in Madrid. "Oj, oj, oj, så glad jeg skal bli" was chosen as the Norwegian entry at the Melodi Grand Prix on 1 March. This was the last of three Eurovision appearances in five years for Sparboe.

The lyrics of "Oj, oj, oj, so glad jeg skal bli" – in which the singer appears to tolerate her partner's philandering ways by trying to convince herself that one day he will give them up and devote himself to her – caused a considerable degree of adverse comment from some sections of Norwegian society and became the subject of a good deal of debate.

Before Eurovision

Melodi Grand Prix 1969
The Melodi Grand Prix 1969 was held at the studios of broadcaster NRK in Oslo, hosted by Janka Polyani. Ten songs took part in the final, with the winner chosen by ten regional juries who each had 5 points to divide between the songs. Other performers included the previous year's Norwegian singer Odd Børre and Lill-Babs, who had sung for Sweden in 1961.

At Eurovision 
On the night of the final Sparboe performed 12th in the running order, following Switzerland and preceding Germany. "Oj, oj, oj, så glad jeg skal bli" was one of the many uptempo pop offerings which dominated the 1969 contest, but appeared not to have been able to distinguish itself from the crowd, as at the close of voting the song had received only 1 point (from Sweden), placing Norway last of the 16 entries, the country's second time at the foot of the scoreboard.

Sverre Christophersen was acting as Norwegian Commentator for the event, however during the broadcast NRK lost contact with Madrid. Janka Polanyi, who was acting as spokesperson for the Norwegian Jury took over as Commentator, before NRK decided to connect with the contest via Sveriges TV. Just before the voting began, NRK were able to regain the connection with Christophersen who continued the broadcast.

Voting

References

External links 
Full national final on nrk.no

1969
Countries in the Eurovision Song Contest 1969
1969
Eurovision
Eurovision